Obstructive purpura is a skin condition that may result from mechanical obstruction to circulation, with resulting stress on the small vessels leading to purpura.

See also 
 Traumatic purpura
 Skin lesion

References 

Vascular-related cutaneous conditions